Philip Moore (b. 1921- d. 2012) was a Guyanese sculptor and painter known for designing the 1763 Monument in Georgetown, Guyana. During his career, he held artist residencies at Livingstone College and Princeton University where he taught wood sculpture. In 1941, he became a Grand Master of the Jordanite religion, and considered his faith to be an integral part of his practice and teaching.

References

1921 births
2012 deaths
Guyanese sculptors
People from East Berbice-Corentyne
20th-century Guyanese painters
Guyanese religious leaders
Livingstone College faculty
Princeton University faculty